The 2022 San Antonio FC season was the club's seventh season of existence. Including the San Antonio Thunder of the original NASL and the former San Antonio Scorpions of the modern NASL, it was the 13th season of professional soccer in San Antonio. The club played in the USL Championship, the second division of the United States soccer league system, and participated in the U.S. Open Cup.

Club 
 Coaching staff 
{|class="wikitable"
|-
!Position
!Staff

|-

|-

|-

|-

|-

|-

|-

|-

|-

|-

|- Other information 

|-

Squad information

First team squad

Player movement

In

Out

Loan in

Loan out

Pre-season 

The pre-season match vs FC Dallas was announced on January 6, 2022, by FCD. The remaining pre-season schedule was released on January 21, 2021, by SAFC.

Competitions

Overall 
Position in the Western Conference

Overview 

{| class="wikitable" style="text-align: center"
|-
!rowspan=2|Competition
!colspan=8|Record
|-
!
!
!
!
!
!
!
!
|-
| USL Championship

|-
| USL Championship Playoffs

|-
| U.S. Open Cup

|-
! Total

USL Championship

Conference table 
Western Conference

Results summary

Results by matchday 

Position in the Western Conference

Matches 
The home opener vs Detroit City was announced on January 6, 2022. Home team is listed first, left to right.

Kickoff times are in CDT (UTC-05) unless shown otherwise

USL Championship Playoffs 

On August 27, 2022, San Antonio clinched a spot in the 2022 USL Championship Playoffs. On October 1, San Antonio secured the best record in the USL Championship regular season, guaranteeing home-field advantage throughout the playoffs.

Lamar Hunt U.S. Open Cup

Exhibition 
On May 10, 2022, it was announced that San Antonio would host Liga MX side Atlético San Luis for an international friendly.

Statistics

Appearances 
Discipline includes league, playoffs, and Open Cup play.

Top scorers 
The list is sorted by shirt number when total goals are equal.

Clean sheets 
The list is sorted by shirt number when total clean sheets are equal.

Summary

Awards

Player

References 

San Antonio FC seasons
San Antonio
San Antonio FC
San Antonio FC